Henk Leeuwis (4 December 1945 – 19 July 2022), known as Henkie, was a Dutch singer. Born in Elst, Netherlands, he was famous for his 2006 Belgian chart-topper "Lief Klein Konijntje" and the 2007 single "Mijn Goudvis".

Henkie died on 19 July 2022, at the age of 76.

References

External links 
 

1945 births
2022 deaths
Dutch male singers
People from Overbetuwe
20th-century Dutch singers
21st-century Dutch singers